Melicytus alpinus, the mahoe porcupine shrub, is a small shrub of the family Violaceae endemic to New Zealand.

Description
Melicytus alpinus get their common name, porcupine shrub, from the long, almost leafless, spindly branches which resemble the quills of a porcupine. Its leaves are narrow and generally have smooth margins with a few exceptions with serrated edges, however, they do only have a small amount of leaves and they are only approximately 1cm long. Hard and dense, slow-growing in coastal or alpine areas of southern North Island and the South Island it looks almost leafless. But most of the leaves are sheltered between the stiff interlacing stems as an adaptation to the harsh environment where the plant grows. Leaves are variable, leathery and about 1cm long.

Range

Natural global range 
The Melicytus alpinus is endemic to New Zealand, and it comes from the family Violaceae which is native to New Zealand.

New Zealand range 
Melicytus alpinus can be found in both the North and South Island of New Zealand in coastal and/or dry alpine areas. It is most common in the South Island high country.

Habitat
Melicytus alpinus is very well adapted to extreme weather conditions such as drought, which is why it can be found in areas such as the heavily modified high country of the South Island.

Ecology

Life cycle/Phenology
In spring and early summer small white flowers turn into tasty fragrant white, blue-specked fruit. Seeds for the porcupine shrub are dispersed by lizards and this allows the porcupine shrub to grow, the shrub grows its flowers in spring to early summer. The flowers are then insect pollinated and produce the small white berries eaten by many native New Zealand lizards, thus starting the cycle again.

Diet and foraging
The porcupine shrub is very resistant to extreme weather conditions and drought; therefore, it lives in areas of dry, rocky soils with very little water availability. It can also be found in coastal areas with saline, dry soils, with very little structure.

Predators, Parasites, and Diseases
Melicytus alpinus is a habitat to many lizard’s endemic to New Zealand, this group of lizards include both skinks and geckos.  This relationship is mutually beneficial/codependent as the lizards use the porcupine shrub as protection from weather and/or predators and in turn eat and spread the seeds from the shrub's berries.

References

 New Zealand Plant Conservation Network, URL: Melicytus alpinus, accessed 2 April 2020.

alpinus